Santiago Ezequiel Vera (born 12 December 1998) is an Argentine professional footballer who plays as a winger for Club Olimpia.

Club career
Vera's career began in the ranks of Almirante Brown, who sold him to River Plate in 2015. Marcelo Gallardo promoted Vera to the club's senior squad for an Argentine Primera División match with San Martín on 17 September 2017, with the midfielder subsequently making his professional debut after being substituted on for Carlos Auzqui with eighteen minutes remaining. Following a further appearance versus Tigre in 2018–19, Vera terminated his contract in August 2019 in order to join Olimpia of the Paraguayan Primera División. He made five appearances off the bench, tallying ninety-nine minutes, in the 2019 campaign.

In January 2020, Vera was loaned to fellow Paraguayan Primera División team San Lorenzo. His first appearance arrived in February versus Nacional, which preceded the right midfielder scoring his first senior goal on 8 March against newly-promoted Guaireña.

International career
In September 2018, Vera was selected to train with the Argentina U17s.

Career statistics
.

Honours
Olimpia
Paraguayan Primera División: 2019 Clausura

References

External links

1998 births
Living people
People from La Matanza Partido
Argentine footballers
Association football midfielders
Argentine expatriate footballers
Argentine Primera División players
Paraguayan Primera División players
Club Atlético River Plate footballers
Club Olimpia footballers
Club Sportivo San Lorenzo footballers
Club Almirante Brown footballers
Expatriate footballers in Paraguay
Argentine expatriate sportspeople in Paraguay
Sportspeople from Buenos Aires Province